The Research Organization for Nuclear Energy (ORTN) is one of Research Organizations under the umbrella of the National Research and Innovation Agency (BRIN). It was founded on 1 September 2021. The organization is the transformation of the National Nuclear Energy Agency of Indonesia (BATAN) after the liquidation of BATAN into BRIN.

History 
Founded on 1 September 2021 as ORTN, ORTN was transformation of BATAN into BRIN. As research organization of BRIN, as outlined in Article 175 and Article 176 of Chief of BRIN Decree No. 1/2021, every Research Organizations under BRIN are responsible and answered to Chief of BRIN. It also prescribed that the Research Organizations consisted with Head of Research Organizations, Centers, and Laboratories/Study Groups. For the transitional period, as in Article 210 of Chairman of BRIN Decree No. 1/2021 mandated, the structure of ORTN follows the preceding structure that was already established during its time in BATAN. Due to this, the structure of ORTN largely follows the Chief of BATAN Decree No. 2/2021.

On 22 September 2021, ORTN constituting document, Chairman of BRIN Decree No. 6/2021, signed by Laksana Tri Handoko and fully published on 8 October 2021. In the constituting document, it is revealed ORTN retained BATAN old name. BATAN acronym however, no longer translated as "", it just simply "BATAN", preserving historical BATAN name. Thus the name become ORTN-BATAN.

On 24 January 2022, ORTN-BATAN structure added with research centers formerly from Nuclear Energy Regulatory Agency and restructured. The change is effective from 1 February 2022. While ORTN-BATAN organization is finalized on 1 March 2022, the head position is yet to be finalized, resulting the organization head still an acting head. The organization name reverted again to ORTN and removing its "BATAN" name thru Chairman of BRIN Decree No. 6/2022, backdated from 25 February 2022.

Structure 
The current structure of ORTN is as follows:

 Office of the Head of ORTN
 Research Center for Radiation Process Technology 
 Research Center for Accelerator Technology
 Research Center for Nuclear Fuel Cycle and Radioactive Waste Technology
 Research Center for Radiation Detection and Nuclear Analysis Technology
 Research Center for Nuclear Reactor Technology
 Research Center for Radioisotopes, Radiopharmaceuticals, and Biodosimetry Technology
 Research Center for Safety, Metrology, Nuclear Quality Technology
 Research Groups

List of Heads

References 

Science and technology in Indonesia
2021 establishments in Indonesia
Research institutes in Indonesia
Nuclear power in Indonesia
National Research and Innovation Agency